Yagwoia (Yeghuye), or Kokwaiyakwa, is an Angan language of Papua New Guinea. Dialects are named after the five ethnicities, Iwalaqamalje, Hiqwaye, Hiqwase, Gwase, Heqwangilye (Yeqwangilje dialect).

Distribution
Yagwoia is spoken in:

Eastern Highlands Province: Iqwalaqamalje
Gulf Province: Gwase
Morobe Province: Hiqwase, Hiqwaye, and Yeqwangilje

External links 
 Paradisec have an open access collection of Yagwoia recordings. They also have a collection of Jadran Mimica recordings that contain some Yagwoia.

References

Angan languages
Languages of Morobe Province
Languages of Gulf Province
Languages of Eastern Highlands Province